The 1960 German football championship was the culmination of the football season in the Federal Republic of Germany in 1959–60. Hamburger SV were crowned champions for the third time after a group stage and a final, having previously won the title in 1923 and 1928. It was the club's third appearance in the final in four years, having lost the 1957 and 1958 final. On the strength of this title, the club participated in the 1960-61 European Cup, where HSV lost to FC Barcelona in the semi-finals.

Hamburg's Uwe Seeler was the 1960 championships top scorer with 13 goals, the highest total for any top scorer in the competition after the Second World War.

Runners-up 1. FC Köln made its first appearance in the national title game. The 1960 German championship saw an attendance record for the Oberliga era with 87,739 seeing Tasmania 1900 Berlin hosting 1. FC Köln.

The format used to determine the German champion was the same as the one used in the 1959 season. Nine clubs qualified for the tournament, with the runners-up of West and South having to play a qualifying match. The remaining eight clubs then played a home-and-away round in two groups of four, with the two group winners entering the final.

Qualified teams
The teams qualified through the 1959–60 Oberliga season:

Competition

Qualifying round

Group 1

Group 2

Final

References

Sources
 kicker Allmanach 1990, by kicker, page 165 & 177 - German championship 1960

External links
 German Championship 1959-60 at Weltfussball.de
 Germany - Championship 1959-60 at RSSSF.com
 German championship 1960 at Fussballdaten.de

1960
1959–60 in German football